Anker Eli Petersen (born 7 June 1959 in Tvøroyri) is a Faroese writer and artist.

He is most known for his many Faroe Islands postage stamp designs under the name Anker Eli. Many of his stamps depict scenes from Norse mythology, Christianity, or interpretations of other Faroese authors or poets. He is also designing the Postverk Føroya web site, that will become a portal about the Faroes, and has illustrated many books.

As a writer, he translates texts from Old Norse, and writes children's carols and lyrics for Faroese singers.

External links 

 Hildarheygur.dk Anker Eli Petersen's website about Nordic folklore
 Tjatsi.fo Postverk Føroya's website about Faroese folklore

1959 births
Living people
Faroese painters
People from Tvøroyri
Faroese songwriters
Faroese stamp designers